The Toronto Congress Centre (TCC) is an event, meeting and trade show complex in the former city of Etobicoke in Toronto, Ontario, Canada, located near Toronto Pearson International Airport.

Built in 1995, the Toronto Congress Centre has 60 meeting rooms, two ballrooms (one being pillar-free) and ten divisible exhibit halls. The convention centre is HACCP certified and is one of the only trade and convention facilities in North America to receive this certification, denoting the highest standards in food preparation safety. Their cuisine is prepared in-house by their 5-star Executive Chef and culinary team. Parking is currently free for all attendees.

The TCC opened in 1995 as the largest in Canada, with close to 500,000 square feet (46,000 m2) of exhibit space. However, it was surpassed by the Enercare Centre  in 1997, the Metro Toronto Convention Centre in 1997 and the International Centre ( in 2002), following various expansions and renovations at those venues. The TCC has since expanded its exhibit space to over one million sq. ft with the addition of a second building (a vacant industrial building purchased in 2006), north of the current building (referred to as the North Building).

In February 2021, it was announced a site at the centre has been prepared as a large-scale clinic for distribution of the COVID-19 vaccine during the COVID-19 pandemic in Toronto.

Exhibitions and events
Some of the annual or notable events and industry trade shows:
 Anime North - anime fan convention
 The Franchise Show
 Landscape Ontario Congress
 Realtor Quest Trade Show
 Security Canada Central
 store 2016 - Retail Council of Canada industry conference
 Toronto RV Show & Sale
 2017 Conservative Party of Canada Leadership Election, final candidate showcase and announcement of results

See also
 Enercare Centre in downtown Toronto
 Metro Toronto Convention Centre in downtown Toronto
 International Centre in Mississauga

References

Convention centres in Canada
Buildings and structures in Toronto
Etobicoke